Engan, also known as Engjan or Enge, is a village in the municipality of Heim in Trøndelag county, Norway. The village is located on the west side of the Valsøyfjorden. Engan has a shop, and the Goat Boat Museum is located here.

References

Heim, Norway
Villages in Trøndelag